The Jericho pipe is a diamondiferous diatreme in the Slave craton of Nunavut, Canada, located  northeast of Yellowknife near the northern end of Contwoyto Lake. It is home to the now closed Jericho Diamond Mine.

See also
List of volcanoes in Canada
Volcanology of Canada
Volcanology of Northern Canada

References

Diatremes of Nunavut
Pre-Holocene volcanoes